The 1983 Campeonato Ecuatoriano de Fútbol de la Serie A was the 25th national championship for football teams in Ecuador.

Teams
The number of teams for this season was played by 14 teams.

First stage

Second stage

Liguilla del No Descenso

Liguilla Final

References

External links
 Línea de Tiempo de eventos y partidos de Liga Deportiva Universitaria
 Calendario de partidos históricos de Liga Deportiva Universitaria
 Sistema de Consulta Interactiva y Herramienta de consulta interactiva de partidos de Liga Deportiva Universitaria

1983
Ecu